The 2010 Heartland Championship was the fifth edition of the New Zealand provincial rugby union competition, since the 2006 reconstruction. The teams represented the 12 amateur rugby unions.

In Round One, the teams were split into two pools of 6 teams in a round-robin format (30 games, from 30 August to 25 September).

In Round Two, the first three teams in each pool of Round One competed for the Meads Cup, the others competed for the Lochore Cup. Each team met the teams from the other pool of Round One in a round-robin format (18 games, from 2 October to 16 October). The first four teams in Round Two went on to the semifinals and then the winners went on to the grand final which was played on 31 October.

The winning teams were Whanganui in the Meads Cup, and Wairarapa-Bush in the Lochore Cup.

Round one

Pool A

Top Point Scorers

Week 1

Week 2

Week 3

Week 4

Week 5

Pool B

Top Point Scorers

Week 1

Week 2

Week 3

Week 4

Week 5

Round two

Meads Cup Pool

Top Point Scorers

Week 6

Week 7

Week 8

Lochore Cup Pool

Top Point Scorers

Week 6

Week 7

Week 8

Finals

The semi-finals began with controversy when West Coast Rugby Football Union were effectively expelled from the competition:

The Meads Cup semi-finals were won by North Otago and Whanganui, defeating Mid-Canterbury and Poverty Bay respectively. In the Lochore Cup, Wairarapa Bush and Buller progressed to the final by beating King Country and Horowhenua-Kapiti respectively.

In the final of the Meads Cup, North Otago won the game 39–18 over Whanganui in the match on 30 October at Whitestone Contracting Stadium.

The 2010 Lochore Cup was won 15–9 by Wairarapa Bush in the game against Buller.

References

External links
 https://web.archive.org/web/20081022184449/http://allblacks.com/index.cfm?layout=heartLandFixtures
 https://web.archive.org/web/20081022184715/http://allblacks.com/index.cfm?layout=heartLandStandings
 http://www.stuff.co.nz/sport/rugby/itm-cup-heartland-championship/heartland-championship/

Heartland Championship
3
Heartland Championship